Malik Sajjad Hussain Joiya is a Pakistani politician who was a Member of the Provincial Assembly of the Punjab, from 1988 to 1996 and again from May 2013 to May 2018.

Early life
He was born on 19 October 1959.

Political career
He was elected to the Provincial Assembly of the Punjab as a candidate of Islami Jamhoori Ittehad (IJI) from Constituency PP-173 (Multan-XIV) in 1988 Pakistani general election. He received 24,384 votes and defeated Muhammad Akram Khan Kanjoo, a candidate of Pakistan Peoples Party (PPP).

He was re-elected to the Provincial Assembly of the Punjab as a candidate of IJI from Constituency PP-173 (Multan-XIV) in 1990 Pakistani general election. He received 30,460 votes and defeated Malik Muhammad Aslam Khan, a candidate of Pakistan Democratic Alliance (PDA).

He was re-elected to the Provincial Assembly of the Punjab as a candidate of PPP from Constituency PP-173 (Multan-XIV) in 1993 Pakistani general election. He received 37,349 votes and defeated Malik Muhammad Aslam Khan, a candidate of Pakistan Muslim League (N) (PML-N).

He ran for the seat of the Provincial Assembly of the Punjab as a candidate of PPP from Constituency PP-173 (Multan-XIV) in 1997 Pakistani general election, but was unsuccessful. He received 24,839 votes and lost the seat to Muhammad Aslam Khan Joya, a candidate of PML-N.

He was re-elected to the Provincial Assembly of the Punjab as an independent candidate from Constituency PP-209 (Lodhran-III) in 2013 Pakistani general election. He received 30,791 votes and defeated Mehmood Nawaz Joiya, a candidate of PML-N. He joined PML-N in May 2013.

References

Living people
Punjab MPAs 2013–2018
1959 births
Pakistan Muslim League (N) politicians
Punjab MPAs 1988–1990
Punjab MPAs 1993–1996
Punjab MPAs 1990–1993